The 2019–20 Eastern Michigan Eagles men's basketball team represented Eastern Michigan University during the 2019–20 NCAA Division I men's basketball season. The Eagles, led by ninth-year head coach Rob Murphy, played their home games at the Convocation Center in Ypsilanti, Michigan as members of the West Division of the Mid-American Conference. They finished the season 16–16, 6–12 in MAC play to finish in a tie for last place in the West Division. They lost in the first round of the MAC tournament to Kent State.

Previous season
The Eagles finished the 2018–19 NCAA Division I men's basketball season 15–17, 9–9 in MAC play to finish in third place in the West Division. They lost in the quarterfinals of the MAC tournament to Ball State.

Offseason

Departures

Incoming

Roster

Schedule and results

|-
!colspan=9 style=| Non-conference regular season

|-
!colspan=9 style=| MAC regular season

|-
!colspan=9 style=| MAC Tournament

References

Eastern Michigan Eagles men's basketball seasons
Eastern Michigan
Eastern Michigan Eagles men's basketball
Eastern Michigan Eagles men's basketball